Michele Romanow (born June 12, 1985) is a Canadian tech entrepreneur, television personality, board director and venture capitalist.  She co-founded Clearbanc, a Toronto based provider of revenue sharing solutions to fund new online businesses, and other e-businesses, and made the list of 100 Most Powerful Women in Canada in 2015. She was named as one of the Forbes Top 20 Most Disruptive "Millennials on a Mission" in 2013 and Canadian Innovation Awards’ Angel Investor of the Year in 2018.  Romanow joined the cast of CBC’s Dragons' Den in Season 10.

Early life 
Romanow was born in Calgary, Alberta, but grew up in Regina, Saskatchewan. She is of Ukrainian descent. She attended Queen's University in Kingston, Ontario and graduated with Civil Engineering and MBA degrees. She was the sole winner of the highest tribute at Queen's, the Agnes Benidickson Tricolour Award, in 2007. Michele is the daughter of Marvin Romanow, the former President & CEO of Nexen.

Business 
Romanow launched her first business, a coffeeshop, in 2006 while studying at Queen's University. Romanow then partnered with two colleagues from her engineering class, Anatoliy Melnichuk and Ryan Marien. Together, they founded Evandale Caviar, Buytopia.ca, and SnapSaves without raising any external capital. Romanow graduated and started Evandale Caviar, a vertically integrated fishery that distributed high end sturgeon caviar to luxury hotels and restaurants. She then became the Director of Strategy for Sears Canada.  In 2011, Romanow started Buytopia.ca which, by 2013, had 2.5M subscribers and had provided over $100M in savings through deals for products, services, events, and travel, with merchants including brands like Cirque du Soleil, Porter Airlines, and Staples. Buytopia also grew by acquiring six competitors.  By 2018, Buytopia joined Emerge Commerce Inc., an e-commerce consolidator founded by Ghassan Halazon, that also acquired other deal sites like WagJag (the Toronto Star deal site), Shop.ca (previously raised $51.5M), under the Emerge parent company.  Romanow started SnapSaves, a mobile couponing app that gives shoppers cash back when they buy certain items in the grocery store by partnering with consumer packaged goods companies.  Groupon purchased SnapSaves in June 2014, relaunched in the U.S. as Snap by Groupon.

She co-founded Clearbanc in 2015, a venture capital firm, alongside Andrew D'Souza. In June 2017, Ruma Bose, the former president of Chobani Ventures LLC, founded the Canadian Entrepreneurship Initiative with support from Michele Romanow and Entrepreneur in Residence, Richard Branson. According to the Globe and Mail, the not-for-profit is meant to help small-business owners get inexpensive financing, and Romanow promised female entrepreneurs applying through the initiative a 10 percent discount on loans obtained through her financial services platform, clearbanc.com.

Clearbanc rebranded itself to Clearco in 2021, and in June 2022, launched in Germany with a pledge of €500 million to local online businesses.

Romanow is currently a director for Vail Resorts (NYSE: MTN), Freshii (TSX: FRII), Shad, Queen’s School of Business  and League of Innovators.  She is a former director for Whistler Blackcomb (TSX: WB).

Romanow was also an investor (minority shareholder) of Goldie nightclub in Toronto, which lost its liquor license after violating social distancing orders during the COVID-19 pandemic in Canada. Following the events that led to the suspension of the liquor license Romanow publicly denounced the management of Goldie, stating that she had no involvement in the day-to-day operation, and that she would exercise her option to sell her shares.

Television 
Romanow is the youngest cast member of the Canadian reality television series Dragons' Den. She joined the cast on Season 10 in 2015, alongside Joe Fresh founder Joe Mimran and Manjit Minhas of Minhas Breweries after the departure of Arlene Dickinson, David Chilton, and Vikram Vij, and continues to appear in 2018 alongside new Dragons Lane Merrifield and Vincenzo Guzzo.

Awards 
Romanow has been recognized with several honors and awards including:
 Canadian Innovation Award Angel Investor of the Year
31 Fastest Growing Company on Profit Magazines Profit Hot 50 Ranking
 #21 Fastest Growing Company on the W100 (3,163% 3 year revenue growth)
 EY Entrepreneur of the Year Finalist
 WXN 100 Most Powerful Women
 RBC Canadian Women Entrepreneur Award Finalist
 Toronto Board of Trade Business Excellence Award
Forbes only Canadian, "Millennial on a Mission"
Michele Romanow Wins The PWI Next Gen Woman Entrepreneur Of The Year Award 2020-21

References 

1985 births
Businesspeople from Calgary
Businesspeople from Saskatchewan
Canadian Jews
Living people
People from Regina, Saskatchewan
Queen's University at Kingston alumni
Canadian people of Ukrainian descent